Apache Beat are a five-piece New York band formed in 2006.

After putting out a slew of singles, Apache Beat released their debut album Last Chants in October 2010. It was recorded, mixed and produced by Martin Bisi and John Agnello in New York and put out on both Inertia Records and Babylon Records.  The record has guest performers from Yeah Yeah Yeahs, The Rapture and Blood Orange.

They have toured in the US, UK and Europe supporting acts such as School of Seven Bells, Gossip, Deerhunter, Crystal Castles, Les Savy Fav and We Are Scientists.

Members 
 Current
 Ilirjana Alushaj
 Michael Dos Santos
 Angus Tarnawsky

 Past members
 Christina Aceto
 Phillip Aceto
 Neil Westgate

Discography

Singles
Tracing Sky - digital only (May 28, 2012)
Another Day (Single Version) - Limited 7" & digital (August 10, 2010)
Your Powers Are Magic (Single Version) - digital only (September 29, 2009)
Tropics (Single Version) - digital only (October 21, 2008)
Blood Thrills / The Western - Limited 7" & digital (May 31, 2008)
Tropics / Your Powers Are Magic - Limited 7" only (October 18, 2007)

Albums
Last Chants - Full Length (October 5, 2010)
"A big leap forward for the dynamic Brooklyn-based post-punk band, especially when Ilirjana Alushaj channel[s] Patti Smith and P.J. Harvey." – The Wall Street Journal
REVIEWS:
Contactmusic.com: 6/10  
Pitchfork: 6.1/10 
PopMatters: 9/10 
URB: 3.5/5

References

External links

Apache Beat at MySpace
Apache Beat Blog

American experimental musical groups
Indie rock musical groups from New York (state)
Musical groups established in 2007
Musical groups from Brooklyn
Noise musical groups